Megachile angulata is a species of bee in the family Megachilidae. It was described by Frederick Smith in 1853.

References

angulata
Insects described in 1853